Vraćevšnica is a village in the municipality of Gornji Milanovac, Serbia. According to the 2002 census, the village has a population of 150 people.

Radič (fl. 1389-1441), a magnate in the service of Serbian monarchs Stefan Lazarević and Đurađ Branković, built the Vraćevšnica monastery in the village in 1428.

References

Populated places in Moravica District